Tilt test may refer to:
 Tilt table test; in medicine the medical procedure often used to diagnose dysautonomia or syncope
 Bielschowsky's head tilt test
 Tilt test (geotechnical engineering); in geotechnical engineering, ground engineering, geotechnics
 Tilt test (vehicle safety test); in vehicle testing